Lara Imogen Leonora Cazalet (born 25 May 1973) is an English actress, known for portraying Zandra Plackett in Bad Girls and Annie Quick in New Street Law.

Early life
Cazalet is the daughter of Sir Edward Cazalet, a retired High Court judge, and his wife, the Honourable Camilla Jane Gage, Lady Cazalet, daughter of Henry Gage, 6th Viscount Gage. Cazalet's paternal grandfather was Major Peter Cazalet, a racehorse-trainer, and her step great-grandfather was English writer, Sir P.G. Wodehouse.

She has two older brothers, David Benedict Cazalet and Henry Pelham Cazalet. Henry, known as Hal, is a composer and opera singer. In addition, Lara and Hal also sing together, professionally, in a jazz trio.

Cazalet attended Bryanston School in Bryanston, Dorset.

Career
Cazalet's first major television role was that of Zandra Plackett in Bad Girls, a part she played for two years until the character died of a brain tumour. The episode where Zandra died was the highest ever rated episode of Bad Girls with 9,490,000 viewers. She later played the lead role of barrister Annie Quick in New Street Law. Cazalet has also made guest appearances in Hustle, Judge John Deed, Waking the Dead and Holby City. She has played four different characters in episodes of The Bill, including a corrupt NCS officer attempting to frame DI Manson for murder and corruption, and the wife of a toy shop manager who robs her husband's store.

Cazalet's film credits include EMR and Lady Godiva.

Filmography

Film

Television

References

External links

 Lara Cazalet fansite

1973 births
Living people
People educated at Bryanston School
English television actresses
English film actresses
Actors from Dorset
Lara